Matthias Almer (born 8 January 1994) is an Austrian male badminton player. In 2013, he won bronze medal at the European Junior Badminton Championships in boys' singles event.

Achievements

European Junior Championships
Boys' Singles

BWF International Challenge/Series
Men's Singles

 BWF International Challenge tournament
 BWF International Series tournament
 BWF Future Series tournament

References

External links
 

1994 births
Living people
Sportspeople from Graz
Austrian male badminton players